The 2011 FIBA Europe Under-18 Championship was the 28th edition of the FIBA Europe Under-18 Championship. 16 teams featured the competition, held in Poland from July 21–31. Lithuania were the defending champion. Spain won their third title.

Teams

Group stages

Preliminary round
In this round, the sixteen teams were allocated in four groups of four teams each. The top three advanced to the qualifying round. The last team of each group played for the 13th–16th place in the Classification Games. 

Times given below are in CEST (UTC+2).

Group A

Group B

Group C

Group D

Qualifying round
The twelve teams remaining were allocated in two groups of six teams each. The four top teams advance to the quarterfinals. The last two teams of each group played for the 9th–12th place.

Group E

Group F

Classification round
The last teams of each group in the preliminary round competed in this Classification Round. The four teams played in one group. The last two teams were relegated to Division B for the next season.

Group G

Knockout round

Championship

5th–8th playoffs

9th–12th playoffs

Classification 9–12

Quarterfinals

Classification 5–8

Semifinals

11th place game

9th place game

7th place game

5th place game

Bronze medal game

Final

Final standings

Awards

External links
Official Site

Under-18 Championship
Europe Under-18 Championship
FIBA U18 European Championship
Europe Under-18 Championship